Temnos or Temnus was a small Greek polis (city-state) of ancient Aeolis, later incorporated in the Roman province of Asia, on the western coast of Anatolia. Its bishopric was a suffragan of Ephesus, the capital and metropolitan see of the province, and is included in the Catholic Church's list of titular sees.

The little town was near the Hermus River, which is shown on its coins. Situated at elevation it commanded a view of the territories of Cyme, Phocaea, and Smyrna. Under Augustus it was already on the decline; under Tiberius it was destroyed by an earthquake; and in the time of Pliny it was no longer inhabited. It was, however, rebuilt later.

One of the city's more noteworthy figures was the rhetorician Hermagoras.

Its site is located near Görece, Asiatic Turkey.

Bishops
Le Quien mentions three bishops:

Eustathius, who lived in 451;
Theophilus, present at the Council of Nice (787);
Ignatius, at Constantinople (869).

This see is not mentioned in the Notitiae Episcopatuum. Ramsay (Asia Minor, 108) thought the diocese of Temnus identical with that of Archangelus, which from the tenth to the thirteenth century the Notitiae Episcopatuum assigns to Smyrna. In 1413 the Turks seized the fortress of Archangelus, which they called Kaiadjik, i.e., small rock; this fortress was situated on the plains of Maenomenus, now known as Menemen.

See also
List of ancient Greek cities

References

Attribution

Cities in ancient Aeolis
Catholic titular sees in Asia
Former populated places in Turkey
Geography of İzmir Province
History of İzmir Province
Populated places in ancient Aeolis
Ancient Greek archaeological sites in Turkey
Greek city-states
Menemen District